The 20901/20902 Mumbai Central - Gandhinagar Capital Vande Bharat Express is India's 3rd Vande Bharat Express train, connecting the states of Maharashtra and Gujarat.

Overview 
This train is operated by Indian Railways, connecting Mumbai Central, Borivali, Vapi, Surat, Vadodara Jn, Ahmedabad Jn and Gandhinagar Capital. It is currently operated with train numbers 20901/20902 on 6 days a week basis.

Rakes 
It is the first 2nd Generation train of Vande Bharat Expresses and was designed and manufactured by the Integral Coach Factory (ICF) under the leadership of Sudhanshu Mani at Perambur, Chennai under the Make in India initiative.

Coach Composition 
The 20901/20902 Mumbai Central - Gandhinagar Capital Vande Bharat Express currently has 14 AC Chair Car and 2 Executive Chair Cars coaches.

The coaches in Aqua color indicate AC Chair Cars and the coaches in Pink color indicate AC Executive Chair Cars.

Service 
The Maximum Permissible Speed (MPS) given is 130 km/hr.

Schedule 
The schedule of this 20901/20902 Mumbai Central - Gandhinagar Capital Vande Bharat Express is given below:-

Incidents 
A week after the inauguration of the 3rd Vande Bharat Express train, this train rammed into cattle near Atul station in Gujarat, on October 29 morning, causing 15-20 delay in reaching its destination. No casualties were involved in this incident.

See also 

 Vande Bharat Express
 Tejas Express
 Gatimaan Express
 Mumbai Central railway station
 Gandhinagar Capital railway station

References 

Vande Bharat Express trains
Named passenger trains of India
Higher-speed rail
Express trains in India
 
Transport in Mumbai
Rail transport in Mumbai
Transport in Gandhinagar

